Miriam Bianca Bulgaru (born 8 October 1998) is a Romanian tennis player.

Bulgaru made her WTA Tour debut at the 2018 Bucharest Open, after having received a wildcard into the singles draw, where she lost her first-round match to Wang Yafan.

ITF finals

Singles: 12 (5 titles, 7 runner-ups)

Doubles: 8 (3 titles, 5 runner-ups)

References

External links
 
 

1998 births
Living people
Romanian female tennis players